Dorian Gray is the stage name of Tony Ellingham, an English pop singer who had a UK Top 40 hit with "I've Got You on My Mind" in 1968.

Early life and education
Sang first with popular Gravesend band 'The Casuals', educated at St Georges School Gravesend Kent. He was born in Gravesend, Kent.

Career
After leaving the music industry for a while, he started the band Unit Five in 1974.

"I've Got You on My Mind" has appeared on compilation albums, including BBC Sounds of the 60's (November 2011) and Honey Honey (August 2013); both albums made the top ten in the compilation charts.

As well as Unit Five, Gray formed another band "5 in the bar" playing jazz and swing, launched in September 2013.

See also

 Lists of musicians
 List of people from Kent
 British pop music

References

Place of birth missing (living people)
1942 births
20th-century English musicians
21st-century English musicians
English male singers
English pop singers
People from Gravesend, Kent
Living people
Musicians from Kent
20th-century English singers
21st-century English singers
20th-century British male singers
21st-century British male singers